Paradise Fire may refer to:

 Paradise Fire (2003), a 2003 California wildfire that burned in San Diego County, California between October and November 2003
 Paradise Fire (2005), a 2005 California wildfire that burned in San Bernardino County, California in June 2005
 Paradise Fire (2008), a 2008 California wildfire that burned in Humboldt County, California in 2008
 Paradise Fire (2015), a 2015 Washington wildfire that burned in Olympic National Park, Washington in 2015
 Paradise Fire (2017), a fire that merged into the High Cascades Complex fires in Oregon in August 2017
 Paradise Fire (2018), another name for the Camp Fire (2018) in Butte County, California
 Paradise Fire (2021), a fire in north-central Kansas, that began on December 17, 2021 and burned about 400,000 acres. Two people died. The area has many farms and ranches, and a large number of cattle died.